is a former Japanese football player. He played for Japan national team.

Club career
Yanagimoto was born in Higashiosaka on October 15, 1972. After graduating from high school, he joined Mazda (later Sanfrecce Hiroshima) in 1991. He played as regular player at right side-back. The club won the 2nd place at 1994 J1 League, 1995 and 1996 Emperor's Cup. In 1999, he moved to his local club Gamba Osaka. He moved to rival team, Cerezo Osaka in 2003. The club won the 2nd place at 2003 Emperor's Cup. He retired end of 2006 season.

International career
In January 1995, Yanagimoto was selected for the Japan national team for the 1995 King Fahd Cup. At this competition, on January 8, he debuted against Argentina. After debut, he became a regular player at right side-back. In 1996, he played in all matches included 1996 Asian Cup. However at 1998 World Cup qualification in March 1997, he got hurt and subsequently dropped from the national team. He had played 30 games for Japan until 1997.

Career statistics

Club

International

Personal life
Yanagimoto married Japanese actress, Atsuko Okamoto, in July 2005, but divorced in July 2017.

References

External links

 
 Japan National Football Team Database
 

1972 births
Living people
Association football people from Osaka Prefecture
Japanese footballers
Japan international footballers
Japan Soccer League players
J1 League players
Sanfrecce Hiroshima players
Gamba Osaka players
Cerezo Osaka players
1995 King Fahd Cup players
1996 AFC Asian Cup players
People from Higashiōsaka
Association football defenders